Gold is a 1974 British thriller film starring Roger Moore and Susannah York and directed by Peter R. Hunt. It was based on the 1970 novel Gold Mine by Wilbur Smith. Moore plays Rodney "Rod" Slater, general manager of a South African gold mine, who is instructed by his boss Steyner (Bradford Dillman) to break through an underground dike into what he is told is a rich seam of gold. Meanwhile, he falls in love with Steyner's wife Terry, played by York. In the United States, the film was released only as part of a double bill.

Plot
The film begins with a tunnel collapse at the world-famous (but fictitious) Sonderditch gold mine outside Johannesburg, establishing the courage of Slater and his chief miner, John Nkulu (known as "Big King"), and the bond of trust between them. This is contrasted with the contempt with which some other managers treat the native miners. Big King is awarded a gold helmet for his heroic efforts to save others. 

It is soon revealed that the collapse was no accident, but a failed part of a plan by a London-based criminal syndicate, which includes the mine-owner's son-in-law and director-manager Manfred Steyner, to destroy the mine so that the syndicate members can profit from share-dealing and raising the price of gold on world markets. This will be done by drilling through a deep underground greenstone wall or dike which is all that prevents an adjacent reservoir of water from flooding the mine.

The mine's general manager, an accomplice in the plot, was killed in the tunnel collapse. Steyner then interviews Slater, the underground manager, for the now vacant post of general manager, although the mine owner/chairman of the board Hurry Hirschfeld (Ray Milland) has the next regular man in seniority in mind as a candidate. During his interview, Slater first meets Steyner's wife Terry at their luxurious mansion and is attracted to her, but she does not at first return his interest. However, Steyner arranges for them to meet again, in the hope that Terry will influence her grandfather, Hurry Hirschfeld, an old curmudgeon whom she lovingly calls "Poppsie", in Slater's favour. The plan works, with two consequences: Slater becomes general manager, and he and Terry start a love affair. 

Slater, unaware of the criminal plan, agrees to carry out the drilling but is cautious enough to plant a safety charge that will block the tunnel in case of a water leak. Steyner soon finds out that Slater is having an affair with his wife, but allows it to continue because it will keep Slater away from the mine, so that the safety charge can be disabled without his knowledge. Meanwhile, syndicate head Farrell has a German member of the syndicate and his young family assassinated by bomb (in a Christmas gift box) after German stock-exchange difficulties hurt Sonderditch interests.

While Slater and Terry are holidaying together over a warm Christmas, the final breach is made in the dike and a wall of water roars into the mazes of tunnels and shafts. The mine begins to flood, trapping a thousand workers. Slater hears of the disaster on the radio news, and flies with Terry in her small private plane back to the mine, making a hair-raising emergency landing on the access road. Slater and Big King descend into the mine, amidst rising flood waters, to repair and reconnect the electrical line to the explosive safety charge that will seal the dike hole. They succeed, but only because Big King sacrifices his own life to detonate the charge, letting Slater fall injured into a rubber dinghy in the flooded tunnel and escape. 

Meanwhile, Steyner is murdered by Marais, one of his accomplices, running him down with his Rolls-Royce limousine while they observe the mine rescue operations from a nearby towering rubble/slag hill after they hear radio reports of Slater's explosive charge sealing the dike and saving the mine, confirming that their plan has unraveled. Marais then goes over the steep hill's edge after hitting his boss, dying as the car crashes and explodes. This conveniently leaves Terry free to continue her relationship with Slater, as her grandfather tells him again as he is loaded into an ambulance – "Slater, you're a maniac!” - with a satisfied smile, and Terry tells Slater, "I love you", as the film ends.

Cast

Roger Moore ...  Rodney "Rod" Slater 
Susannah York ...  Terry Steyner 
Ray Milland ...  Hurry Hirschfeld 
Bradford Dillman ...  Manfred Steyner 
John Gielgud ...  Farrell – syndicate head
Tony Beckley ...  Stephen Marais 
Simon Sabela ...  'Big King' 
Bernard Horsfall ...  Dave Kowalski 
Marc Smith ...  Tex Kiernan 
John Hussey ...  Plummer 
Bill Brewer ...  Aristide 
George Jackson ...  Mine Doctor 
Ken Hare ...  Jackson 
Ralph Loubser ...  Mine Captain
Patsy Kensit ... Daughter of German syndicate member

Book

The movie is based on a 1970 novel by Wilbur Smith.

The story was based on a real-life flooding of a gold mine near Johannesburg in 1968. Smith researched the book by working in a gold mine for a few weeks. "I was a sort of privileged member of the team, I could ask questions and not be told to shut up", he says.

The New York Times said "Mr Smith, an adventure writer disdainful of subtleties, blasts his way to a finale strewn with broken bodies and orange blossoms."

Development
Producer Michael Klinger bought the rights to it and Shout at the Devil as his follow up to Get Carter. "Actually they're both just as tough as Carter,” said Klinger of the projects. The South African government promised to co operate in filming at the mines.

The film Klinger most wanted to make was Shout at the Devil. However, because it was a period film it needed a large budget. Gold was cheaper because it told a contemporary story and he ended up filming that instead.

Klinger tried to set up the film with MGM, for whom he had made Get Carter. The studio bought out Klinger's option for Gold Mine for £25,000, but insisted that Klinger hire an experienced writer, Stanley Price, to work on the script along with Wilbur Smith. MGM later withdrew from the project – they were pulling out of all production in Britain – and Klinger bought back rights to the novel and script. The budget of over £1 million was raised mostly from South African businessmen.

Roger Moore was cast in the lead. It was his first film since making his debut as James Bond in Live and Let Die (1973). He was paid $200,000 plus a percentage of the profits. Producer Michael Klinger used a number of other people associated with James Bond films, including editor John Glen, production designer Syd Cain, titles designer Maurice Binder and director Peter Hunt.

Tony Klinger, assistant to the producer, said he tried to get Steven Spielberg to direct the movie after having been impressed by Duel. However, Roger Moore vetoed the choice on the basis of Spielberg's youth. "Roger was, I think, a little insecure about his acting ability, and as a consequence was always protective of his image, like most movie stars that are less actor and more star. I guess that's why we got the message loud and clear that he turned down our first choice for the director for Gold", he said.

Filming
The film was controversially filmed in South Africa under the apartheid regime, with scenes shot at two large mines, Buffelfontein and West Rand. "We had to drop down two miles, which was horrendous,” said Moore. "It was great to start with, and I got tremendously enthusiastic about the mine, but after ten days down there it got very claustrophobic."

Some scenes were filmed at Pinewood Studios in London.

The British film union, ACTT, put a black ban on the movie because its members were forbidden to work in South Africa. The Union suggested the film be shot in a mine in Wales instead but the filmmakers refused, claiming Wales looked nothing like South Africa. Some members defied the ban.

Bradford Dillman later recalled "Susannah York, a militant liberal, used every publicity opportunity to deplore the conditions of the black miners, despite pleas from the producers to cool it."

The complexity of filming the final flood scenes resulted in the movie going over budget.

Klinger tried to sell the film to companies such as British Lion, Anglo-EMI, and Rank, but was rejected. He succeeded in selling the film to Hemdale.

Reception
The film was popular at the box office – it was one of the 19 most popular films at the British box office in 1974 – enabling Klinger to raise finance for Shout at the Devil.

Critical
The Los Angeles Times said the film "is everything people have in mind when they talk about a movie movie. Its hero is heroic, its heroine is beautiful and kittenishly sexy, its villains are outrageously villainous, its characters crustily colorful. It has scope, scale, surprise. It has more punch than a 15 round fight and more corn than Kansas. It is a travelogue of South Africa and a fascinating audiovisual essay on gold mining."

Awards and nominations

References

External links
 
 
Gold Mine at Wilbur Smith Books
Review of film at New York Times
Review of film at Variety

1974 films
Allied Artists films
British thriller films
British disaster films
1970s English-language films
Films scored by Elmer Bernstein
Films based on South African novels
Films set in South Africa
1970s thriller films
1970s disaster films
Films shot at Pinewood Studios
Films directed by Peter R. Hunt
Films about mining
Films set in London
1970s British films